Cloncrow Bog (New Forest) is a peat bog in County Westmeath, Ireland. The bog is near the village of Tyrrellspass on the R446 regional road.

As a raised bog of ecological interest, it was declared a Natural Heritage Area in 2005.

See also
Tyrrellspass
Bog of Allen
Milltownpass Bog

References

Bogs of the Republic of Ireland
Landforms of County Westmeath
Natural Heritage Areas of the Republic of Ireland
Protected areas established in 2005